The Billboard Hot 100 is a chart that ranks the best-performing singles of the United States. Its data, compiled by Nielsen SoundScan and published by Billboard magazine, is based collectively on each single's weekly physical and digital sales, as well as airplay and streaming.

During 2015, eight singles reached number one on the Hot 100; a ninth single, "Blank Space" by Taylor Swift, began its run at number one in November 2014. Of those nine number-one singles, three were collaborations. In total, ten acts topped the chart as either lead or featured artists, with six—Mark Ronson, Charlie Puth, Kendrick Lamar, Omi, The Weeknd and Justin Bieber—achieving their first Hot 100 number-one single. Mark Ronson and Bruno Mars' "Uptown Funk" was the longest-running number-one of the year, leading the chart for fourteen weeks; it subsequently topped the Billboard Year-End Hot 100.

Chart history

Number-one artists

See also
2015 in American music
List of Billboard 200 number-one albums of 2015
List of Billboard Hot 100 top 10 singles in 2015

References

External links

United States Hot 100
2015
Hot 100 number-one singles